Boulenophrys sangzhiensis is a species of frog in the family Megophryidae. It is endemic to China, being only known from the type locality in Sangzhi County, Hunan, in south-central China.

References

Boulenophrys
Amphibians of China
Endemic fauna of China
Amphibians described in 2008